The 2016–17 Hong Kong First Division League was the 3rd season of Hong Kong First Division League since it became the second-tier football league in Hong Kong in 2014–15.

Teams

Changes from last season

From First Division League
Promoted to Hong Kong Premier League
 Tai Po
 HKFC

Relegated to Second Division League
 Lucky Mile
 Sun Source

To First Division League
Relegated from Premier League
 Wong Tai Sin
 Metro Gallery

Promoted from Second Division League
 Eastern District
 Tung Sing

League table

References

Hong Kong First Division League seasons
Hong